Kürdəbazlı (also, Kyurdabazly and Gyurd-Abazli) is a village and municipality in the Masally Rayon of Azerbaijan.  It has a population of 620.

References 

Populated places in Masally District